The Kansas Bureau of Investigation (KBI) is the state bureau of investigation of the U.S. state of Kansas. The KBI is a division of the Kansas Attorney General and responsible for providing investigative and criminal laboratory services to criminal justice agencies, as well as investigating and preventing crime in the state of Kansas. Kirk Thompson is the current director of the KBI.

The KBI has nearly 300 employees including 72 special agents and 181 civilian employees.

KBI's Mission 
“The Kansas Bureau of Investigation is dedicated to providing professional investigative, laboratory and criminal justice information services to criminal justice agencies for the purpose of promoting public safety and preventing crime in Kansas."

History 
The Kansas Legislature established The Kansas Bureau of Investigation in 1939. The bureau is a division of the Office of the Attorney General. The KBI assists local law enforcement agencies with more mobile and criminal activity. In the early years, the crimes were often bank robberies. Today, the KBI’s main task is providing expertise and assistance to local law enforcement departments in handling criminal incidents. The KBI has also been given the authority to maintain the state’s criminal justice records. Years later, the KBI Forensic Science Laboratory was added to assist the criminal justice community in Kansas with forensic science services.

The KBI was the primary agency involved in the murder investigation chronicled in Truman Capote's In Cold Blood as well as confirming the identity of the BTK Killer in Wichita.

Organization of the KBI 
The KBI Divisions include:

 Field Investigations Division
 Special Operations Division
 Forensic Laboratory Division
 Information Services Division
 Information Technology

Directors
Since its founding, the KBI has had 12 directors.

 Lou Richter (1939–1956)
 Logan H. Sanford (1957–1969)
 Harold R. Nye (1969–1971)
 Fred H. Howard II (1971–1975)
 William H. Albott (1975–1979)
 Thomas E. Kelly (1979–1987)
 David E. Johnson (1987–1989)
 James G. Malson (1989–1992)
 Robert B. Davenport (1992–1994)
 Larry Welch (1994–2007)
 Robert E. Blecha (2007–2011)
 Kirk D. Thompson (2011–present)

Office locations
The KBI maintains offices at the following locations.

Headquarters
 Topeka

Regional offices
 Overland Park
 Great Bend
 Wichita
 Pittsburg (Southeast Kansas Drug Enforcement Taskforce)

KBI Programs

Drug Enforcement 
The KBI is involved in the fight against drugs and does its part to educate citizens on the signs and activity of illegal drug use and abuse.

KS Missing Person 
The KBI provides information that will aid law enforcement, parents, missing children’s agencies and others seeking to find their loved ones. The goal of the Kansas Bureau of Investigation is the resolution of all missing or unidentified person cases. Additionally, the KBI provides support groups for people involved in missing person cases.

Resources 

 Missing Persons Brochure 
 Kansas Missing Children's Day Poster Contests 
 Parental Abductions 
 You Can Help! 
 Kansas AMBER Alert Web Site

Support groups
 Take Root 
 Team Hope 
 NetSmartz Workshop 
 2 Smart 4 U

Kansas Most Wanted 
The KBI keeps records of Kansas’ most wanted criminals and provides resources for assisting law enforcement.

Kansas Sexual Assault Kit Initiative 
The KBI started the Kansas Sexual Assault Kit Initiative (SAKI) in 2014. They began determining the number of submitted sexual assault kits had been collected by forensic nurses and turned over to law enforcement without being sent to a crime laboratory for forensic analysis. The Bureau of Justice Assistance awarded the KBI a $2 million grant in 2015 to support their efforts. In addition to collecting untested kits, the KBI started a multidisciplinary working group to evaluate the underlying factors contributing to the accumulation of this forensic evidence. The group has been working to create evidence-based recommendations and model policy to address the inventory and prevent an accumulation in the future. More information about the results of the initiative can be in the Kansas SAKI Brochure.

Registered Offender Search 
The KBI created the Registered Offender Search to facilitate public access to information about persons who have been convicted of certain sex, violent and drug offenses that are set forth in the Kansas Offender Registration Act. The Website is updated every fifteen minutes, and the KBI works to ensure the information is complete, accurate and up to date.

 Conduct a Kansas Registered Offenders Search
 Conduct a National Sex Offender Search
 Conduct a KASPER (DOC) Search

References

External links
Kansas Bureau of Investigation official website
Kansas Bureau of Investigation publications at the KGI Online Library

State law enforcement agencies of Kansas
Government agencies established in 1939
1939 establishments in Kansas
State Bureaus of Investigation